Ron Young may refer to:

 Ron Young (United States Army officer) (born 1977), former POW in the 2003 Gulf military action; contestant in the reality show The Amazing Race 7
 Ron Young (politician) (born 1946), member of the Ohio House of Representatives
 Ron Young (racing driver) (born 1970), American stock car racing driver
 Ron Young (footballer, born 1925) (1925–1991), English football wing half for Bournemouth & Boscombe Athletic
 Ron Young (footballer, born 1945) (born 1945), English football winger for Hull City and Hartlepool
 Ron Young (jurist), New Zealand jurist
 Ronald N. Young (born 1940), state senator in Maryland and former mayor of Frederick, Maryland